The men's 4 x 100 metres relay at the 1950 European Athletics Championships was held in Brussels, Belgium, at Heysel Stadium on 23 and 27 August 1950.

Medalists

Results

Final
27 August

Heats
23 August

Heat 1

Heat 2

Participation
According to an unofficial count, 36 athletes from 9 countries participated in the event.

 (4)
 (4)
 (4)
 (4)
 (4)
 (4)
 (4)
 (4)
 (4)

References

4 x 100 metres relay
Relays at the European Athletics Championships